Taylor Adams (born 20 September 1993) is a professional Australian rules footballer playing for the Collingwood Football Club in the Australian Football League (AFL). He previously played for the Greater Western Sydney Giants from 2012 to 2013.

State football
Adams started out playing Australian rules football at St Joseph's, at under-14 and under-16 levels, before joining the Geelong Falcons in the TAC Cup. He served as a captain for Geelong Falcons, and the opportunities and responsibilities helped shape him and he thanked the club during his first Australian Football League (AFL) season. Adams represented Vic County in the 2011 AFL Under 18 Championships and was selected for the All-Australian Team after averaging 18.8 possessions over 4 games. He later had an impressive performance at the AFL Draft Combine, finishing in the top 10 on the beep test.

AFL career

Great Western Sydney
Adams was drafted by the Greater Western Sydney Giants with pick 13 in the 2011 national draft. He made his debut in round 5 of the 2012 season, against Western Bulldogs at Manuka Oval, kicking a goal, taking five marks, and having seven kicks, 10 handballs, 17 disposals, and three tackles.

Collingwood
In October 2013, Adams was traded to Collingwood, as a swap for Heath Shaw. He made his debut for Collingwood in the opening round of the 2014 season, against Fremantle. After joining the club, at the beginning the pressure and large crowds affected him, leading to him performing poorly until team-mate Ben Johnson advised him to chill, leading to him playing better football. In round 8 of the 2015 season, Adams played his 50th AFL game. Ahead of the 2016 season, Adams joined Collingwood's leadership group. Ahead of the 2017 season Adams was appointed vice-captain alongside Steele Sidebottom, before being selected only for the leadership group in 2018 and 2019, returning to vice-captaincy ahead of the 2020 season. In the third round of the 2018 season, Adams played his 100th AFL game against Carlton. At the end of the season he was awarded Collingwood's Bob Rose award for being the Best Finals' Player, after averaging 29 possessions, five clearances, and seven tackles over four games. He was a standout player in the Grand Final, with 31 possessions, nine clearances, and a goal, leading to him being voted the runner-up for the Norm Smith Medal, which was won by West Coast player Luke Shuey. In July 2019, Adams signed a five-year contract extension.
In September 2022 Adams tore his groin off the bone.

Personal life
Taylor grew up in Mount Duneed just outside the coastal town of Torquay in Victoria. He attended Christian College in Geelong. He came from a Geelong-supporting family, including his father and grandmother.

Adams is currently studying a Graduate Certificate of Business Administration at Deakin University.

Charges and arrests
In April 2012, Adams was charged with assault after an altercation at a bar in Geelong which happened in January. In January 2015, he was arrested and charged for being drunk in public after a fight at a Geelong bar.

Statistics
Updated to the end of the 2022 season.

|-
| 2012 ||  || 30
| 15 || 5 || 1 || 167 || 131 || 298 || 51 || 53 || 0.3 || 0.1 || 11.1 || 8.7 || 19.9 || 3.4 || 3.5 || 0
|- 
| 2013 ||  || 11
| 16 || 7 || 6 || 209 || 132 || 341 || 69 || 52 || 0.4 || 0.4 || 13 || 8.3 || 23.3 || 4.3 || 3.3 || 0
|-
| 2014 ||  || 13
| 12 || 2 || 3 || 114 || 116 || 230 || 34 || 43 || 0.2 || 0.3 || 9.5 || 9.7 || 19.2 || 2.8 || 3.6 || 0
|- 
| 2015 ||  || 13
| 18 || 7 || 6 || 254 || 240 || 494 || 79 || 90 || 0.4 || 0.3 || 14.1 || 13.3 || 27.4 || 4.4 || 5.0 || 8
|-
| 2016 ||  || 13
| 14 || 6 || 1 || 212 || 176 || 388 || 64 || 62 || 0.4 || 0.1 || 15.1 || 12.6 || 27.7 || 4.6 || 4.4 || 5
|- 
| 2017 ||  || 13
| 22 || 9 || 8 || 328 || 321 || 649 || 111 || 140 || 0.4 || 0.4 || 14.9 || 14.6 || 29.5 || 5.1 || 6.4 || 14
|-
| 2018 ||  || 13
| 23 || 9 || 9 || 330 || 290 || 620 || 78 || 120 || 0.4 || 0.4 || 14.3 || 12.6 || 27.0 || 3.4 || 5.2 || 6
|- 
| 2019 ||  || 13
| 12 || 5 || 5 || 174 || 119 || 293 || 47 || 61 || 0.4 || 0.4 || 14.5 || 9.9 || 24.4 || 3.9 || 5.1 || 0
|-
| 2020 ||  || 13
| 19 || 9 || 2 || 245 || 186 || 431 || 63 || 103 || 0.5 || 0.1 || 12.9 || 9.8 || 22.7 || 3.3 || 5.4 || 11
|- 
| 2021 ||  || 13
| 14 || 2 || 2 || 195 || 187 || 382 || 46 || 78 || 0.1 || 0.1 || 13.9 || 13.4 || 27.3 || 3.3 || 5.6 || 5
|- 
| 2022 ||  || 13
| 18 || 2 || 6 || 194 || 206 || 400 || 48 || 91 || 0.1 || 0.3 || 10.8 || 11.4 || 22.2 || 2.7 || 5.1 || 2
|- class=sortbottom
! colspan=3 | Career
! 183 !! 63 !! 49 !! 2422 !! 2104 !! 4526 !! 690 !! 893 !! 0.3 !! 0.3 !! 13.2 !! 11.5 !! 24.7 !! 3.8 !! 4.9 !! 51
|}

Notes

Honours and achievements
Individual
 Copeland Trophy: 2020
 All-Australian team: 2020

References

External links

1993 births
Living people
Greater Western Sydney Giants players
Collingwood Football Club players
Australian rules footballers from Geelong
Geelong Falcons players
All-Australians (AFL)
Copeland Trophy winners